Florian Trokthi (born 26 June 2001) is an Albanian professional footballer who is currently playing as a right-back for Burreli in Kategoria e Parë.

References

2001 births
Living people
People from Lezhë County
People from Kurbin
People from Laç
Albanian footballers
Association football defenders
Akademia e Futbollit players
Kategoria e Parë players
Kategoria Superiore players
KF Laçi players
KF Erzeni players
KS Burreli players